In Greek mythology, the name Asterodia, Asterodeia, or Asterodea (Ancient Greek: Ἀστεροδεία, Ἀστεροδία) refers to:

Asterodia, a Caucasian nymph, daughter of Oceanus and Tethys, mother of Absyrtus by Aeetes.
Asterodia, a Phocian princess, daughter of King Deion and Diomede, and sister of Aenetus, Phylacus, Actor and Cephalus. She was also called Asteria, the one who bore Crisus and Panopeus to Phocus. These twin brothers did not get along, quarreling while still in the womb of their mother.
Asterodia, one of the possible wives of Endymion.
Asterodia, daughter of Eurypylus and one of the possible wives of Icarius.

Notes

References 

Apollodorus, The Library with an English Translation by Sir James George Frazer, F.B.A., F.R.S. in 2 Volumes, Cambridge, MA, Harvard University Press; London, William Heinemann Ltd. 1921. ISBN 0-674-99135-4. Online version at the Perseus Digital Library. Greek text available from the same website.
Apollonius of Rhodes, Apollonius Rhodius: the Argonautica, translated by Robert Cooper Seaton, W. Heinemann, 1912. Internet Archive.
 Apollonius of Rhodes, The Argonautics of Apollonius Rhodius, Translated; with Notes and Observations, Critical, Historical, and Explanatory, by W. Preston, ESQ. M. R. I. A. Volume 2, Press of C. Whittingham, 1822. Internet Archive
Apollonius Rhodius, Argonautica translated by Robert Cooper Seaton (1853-1915), R. C. Loeb Classical Library Volume 001. London, William Heinemann Ltd, 1912. Online version at the Topos Text Project.
Apollonius Rhodius, Argonautica. George W. Mooney. London. Longmans, Green. 1912. Greek text available at the Perseus Digital Library.
 Brunck, Richard François Philippe, Apollonii Rhodii Argonautica Volume 2: Scholia vetera in Apollonium Rhodium, second edition by G. H. Schäfer, Fleischer, 1813. Internet Archive
Conti, Natale, John Mulryan, Steven Brown, Natale Conti's Mythologiae, ACMRS, 2006.
 Hard, Robin, The Routledge Handbook of Greek Mythology: Based on H.J. Rose's "Handbook of Greek Mythology", Psychology Press, 2004, .
Hesiod, Catalogue of Women from Homeric Hymns, Epic Cycle, Homerica translated by Evelyn-White, H G. Loeb Classical Library Volume 57. London: William Heinemann, 1914. Online version at theio.com
Pausanias, Description of Greece with an English Translation by W.H.S. Jones, Litt.D., and H.A. Ormerod, M.A., in 4 Volumes. Cambridge, MA, Harvard University Press; London, William Heinemann Ltd. 1918. . Online version at the Perseus Digital Library
Pausanias, Graeciae Descriptio. 3 vols. Leipzig, Teubner. 1903.  Greek text available at the Perseus Digital Library.
 Smith, William; Dictionary of Greek and Roman Biography and Mythology, London (1873).

Oceanids
Princesses in Greek mythology
Queens in Greek mythology
Phocian characters in Greek mythology
Elean characters in Greek mythology